Nothofagus baumanniae is a species of tree in the family Nothofagaceae. It is endemic to New Caledonia, where it grows in forests at high elevations. The species is threatened by fires, nickel mining and climate change.

References

Nothofagaceae
Endemic flora of New Caledonia
Taxonomy articles created by Polbot